Herbert Nitsch (born 20 April 1970) is an Austrian freediver who has held world records in all of the eight freediving disciplines recognised by AIDA International. He is the current freediving world record champion and "the deepest man on earth". To date, he has achieved 33 official World Records across all freediving disciplines, and one world record in the traditional Greek discipline of Skandalopetra .

Background 
Nitsch worked part-time as a pilot for Tyrolean Airways.

Freediving

Achievements and competition history 
Nitsch holds the No-Limits record, the title of "Deepest man on Earth" in which the diver can make use of a weighted sled to descend as far as possible and uses an air-filled balloon or other buoyancy device to return to the surface. He also held the world record in the Constant Weight event, which is considered by many to be the classic free-diving discipline: the diver descends next to a line, not using the line and unaided by a sled, and must maintain a constant weight, meaning that no weight can be dropped for the return to the surface.

Later in 2007, he also set the Constant weight (No Fins) record during The Triple Depth in Dahab, Egypt, and went on to push the Constant record to  during the World Championships in Sharm. Herbert also won the AIDA Individual World Championships.

Of the other five AIDA recognised events, Nitsch has been the world record holder in four: Static Apnea, Dynamic Apnea, Free Immersion and Dynamic apnea without fins. He set a time of 9 mins 4 secs for the world Static Apnea record in December 2006 when he held his breath underwater in a swimming pool in Hurgada, a time that was beaten by 4 secs in 2007 by Tom Sietas of Germany. Nitsch's Dynamic Apnea record, 183 m set in 2002, has been beaten by 40 m by Tom Sietas and women's champion, Natalia Molchanova of Russia, has also swum further than 200 m. Sietas also holds the Dynamic apnea without fins record at 183 m, beating Nitsch's 2001 distance of 134 m by almost 50 m.

He used his arms only in the last  of this ascent, with a total dive time of 3:58.

During his last competition before retiring from competitive freediving in April 2010 at Vertical Blue, again at the Dean's Blue Hole in Bahamas, Nitsch set another three world records.

Nitsch focused solely on the "No Limit" events after this, in which the record attempts fall outside of regulated competition.

Nitsch temporarily fell asleep due to nitrogen narcosis during the last part of the ascent (as opposed to through oxygen starvation), and woke up prior to reaching the surface. Following a planned post-dive decompression, breathing medical oxygen at a shallow depth, he signaled to his support team that he felt much weaker than normal and his condition was assessed as critical enough to require an air transfer to a pre-alerted decompression chamber in Athens, where he received treatment. He incurred multiple brain strokes due to severe decompression sickness. He subsequently received extensive decompression treatment in Germany.

The initial prognosis was that he would need home care and be unable to walk without assistance. However, through extensive rehabilitation, he made a strong recovery. He still has balance and coordination problems on land, but does not experience them underwater. He continues to deep free-dive.

Awards and honors 
Asteroid 295471 Herbertnitsch, discovered by Italian amateur astronomer Vincenzo Casulli in 2008, was named in his honor. The official  was published by the Minor Planet Center on 27 August 2019.

Official records 
Nitsch remains to date the only person that achieved world records across all of AIDA's eight freediving disciplines, in addition to the one he had set in the Greek discipline of Skandalopetra.

72m = AIDA Lake Record; after 2001-12-31 AIDA International no longer separated the records achieved in a lake from those in the sea.

Personal bests

Filmography 
Documentaries and TV
 2017: Herbert Nitsch, The Deepest Man On Earth, by UPROXX – 
 2016: Supertalent Mensch: Körperbeherrscher, by Terra X – 
 2013: Back from the Abyss / Züruck as der Tiefe, the multiple award-winning documentary by Red Bull Media House - Trailer Back from the Abyss:  and  
 2012: La Dernière Frontière, by Camera Lucida - 
 2011: The man who can hold his breath for nine minutes – Inside the Human Body: First to Last, by BBC One- 
 2009: Apnoetauchen: Neun Minuten ohne einen Atemzug, by Focus Online – 
 2009: Stefan Raab by TV Total 
 2009: Aeschbacher by SRF 

Publicity 
 2017: Hyundai Fuel Cell Car Unveiling, by Hyundai -  and 
 2011: Extreme 800, by Breitling -

References

External links 
 
 *
 
 
 
 

1970 births
Living people
Austrian freedivers